Comics Revue is a bi-monthly  small press comic book published by Manuscript Press and edited by Rick Norwood. Don Markstein edited the publication from 1984 to 1987 and 1992 to 1996.

As of 2020, it has published more than 350 issues, making it the longest running independent comic book (beating the record of Cerebus the Aardvark). It reprints comic strips such as Alley Oop, The Amazing Spider-Man, Barnaby, Batman, Buz Sawyer, Casey Ruggles, Flash Gordon, Gasoline Alley, Hägar the Horrible, Krazy Kat, Lance, Latigo, Little Orphan Annie, Mandrake the Magician, Modesty Blaise, O'Neill, Peanuts, The Phantom, Rick O'Shay, Sir Bagby, Star Wars, Steve Canyon, Tarzan, Akwas, and Teenage Mutant Ninja Turtles.

Artists whose work has appeared in Comics Revue include most of the best known names in comics art: Jack Kirby, Milton Caniff, Hal Foster, Charles Schulz, Al Williamson, George Pérez, Roy Crane, Russ Manning, and Burne Hogarth.

In issue #200, Comics Revue featured the only English language publication of "The Dark Angels", the last Modesty Blaise story, by Peter O'Donnell and Romero.

In 2006, it was revealed in Absolute Crisis on Infinite Earths that the Batman stories published in Comics Revue actually happened on Earth-1289.

In October 2009, the magazine re-launched as a bi-monthly title with twice the number of pages and reprinting Sunday strips in color. Each issue now includes at least one complete story.

Issue #400 includes a complete index to all comic strips published in Comics Revue #1-400 prepared by Bill Slankard.

References 
 Comics Buyer's Guide, "Rick Norwood has produced this labor of love for years now, and it continues to be a bargain. (list of contents) Absolutely recommended." -- Maggie Thompson.
 Tony Isabella, Comics Buyer's Guide, "Not every strip will be a winner with every reader, but I like Comics Revue enough to give it four Tonys." 
 Louis Cance, Hop! No. 112, "Comics Revue  Ce mensuel propose dans ses 68 pages une belle sélection de grands classiques de la BD américaine avec..."  (Comics Revue.  This monthly magazine reprints in its 68 pages a beautiful selection great classic comic strips from America, including...") (list of contents)

External links
 Comics Revue
 The Grand Comics Database

American comics titles
Comic strips